Kilby is a village and civil parish in Leicestershire, England.

Kilby may also refer to:

Places
 Kilby Bridge, a hamlet in Leicestershire, England
 Kilby Correctional Facility, a prison in Alabama, United States
 Kilby Island and Kilby Reef, places in Antarctica
 Kilby Provincial Park, a park in British Columbia, Canada

Other uses
 Kilby (name)
 Kilby International Awards, a high-technology educational foundation